Przemyslaw Shamek Pietucha (August 24, 1976 – October 10, 2015) was a Polish-born Canadian swimmer who represented Canada in international competition at the Summer Olympics, FINA World Championships and Pan American Games.  Pietucha was a butterfly specialist who won six medals in major international championships.

He was born in Malbork, Poland, but grew up in Calgary, Alberta, where he began competitive swimming.

Pietucha accepted an athletic scholarship to attend the University of Virginia (UVa) in Charlottesville, Virginia, where he swam for the Virginia Cavaliers swimming and diving team in National Collegiate Athletic Association (NCAA) and Atlantic Coast Conference (ACC) competition from 1996 to 1999.  During his four-year college career, he received nine All-American honours, was chosen team captain as a senior, and won the NCAA national title in the 200-yard butterfly in 1999.

While swimming collegiately for Virginia, Pietucha was also a member of the Canadian national swim team.  He won silver and bronze medals in the 100- and 200-metre butterfly events, respectively, at the 1997 World University Games.  Two years later at the 1999 Pan American Games in Winnipeg, he won a gold medal in the 200-metre butterfly, a silver in the 100-metre butterfly, and a bronze as a member of Canada's third-place team in the 4x100-metre medley relay.

After graduating from UVa, he finished second in the 200-metre butterfly at the 2000 Short Course World Championships, and qualified as a member of the Canadian Olympic team in 2000.  At the 2000 Summer Olympics in Athens, he competed in the preliminary heats of the 100- and 200-metre butterfly events, but did not advance.  He also swam for the 6th place Canadian relay team in the qualifying heats of the 4x100-metre medley, but not in the final.

Up until his death in 2015, Pietucha was a practicing integrative medicine physician in Canada.

His other accomplishments included:
 2000 World Cup VI gold medallist, 200-metre butterfly, Hobart, Australia
 1999 World Cup II gold medallist, 100- and 200-metre butterfly, Edmonton, Alberta
 1998 U.S. Open champion, 100- and 200-metre butterfly, Indianapolis, Indiana
 Canadian national record-holder, 200-metre butterfly
 Six-time Canadian national champion

See also

 List of Commonwealth Games medallists in swimming (men)
 List of University of Virginia people

References

External links
 Canadian Olympic Committee

1976 births
2015 deaths
Canadian male butterfly swimmers
Polish emigrants to Canada
Olympic swimmers of Canada
People from Malbork
Swimmers from Calgary
Sportspeople from Pomeranian Voivodeship
Swimmers at the 1998 Commonwealth Games
Swimmers at the 1999 Pan American Games
Swimmers at the 2000 Summer Olympics
University of California, Santa Cruz alumni
Virginia Cavaliers men's swimmers
Commonwealth Games medallists in swimming
Pan American Games gold medalists for Canada
Pan American Games silver medalists for Canada
Pan American Games bronze medalists for Canada
Commonwealth Games bronze medallists for Canada
Pan American Games medalists in swimming
Universiade medalists in swimming
Universiade silver medalists for Canada
Universiade bronze medalists for Canada
Medalists at the 1997 Summer Universiade
Medalists at the 1999 Pan American Games
Medallists at the 1998 Commonwealth Games